Notion is a freemium productivity and note-taking web application developed by Notion Labs Inc. It offers organizational tools including task management, project tracking, to-do lists, bookmarking, and more. Additional offline features are offered by desktop and mobile applications available for Windows, macOS, Linux, Android, and iOS. Users can create custom templates, embed videos and web content, and collaborate with others in real-time.

History
Notion Labs Inc is a startup based in San Francisco, founded in 2013 by Ivan Zhao, Chris Prucha, Jessica Lam, Simon Last and Toby Schachman. At that time, they declined to meet any venture capitalists or discuss acquiring a higher valuation.

In March 2018, Notion 2.0 was released. It was positively received by Product Hunt and rated #1 Product of the Month. At that point, the company had fewer than 10 employees.

In June 2018, an official Android app was released.

In September 2019, the company announced it had reached 1 million users. In April 2020, it became valued at two billion dollars.

In January 2020, Notion received $50 million in investments from Index Ventures and other investors.

On September 7, 2021, Notion acquired Automate.io, a Hyderabad-based startup. In October of that year, a new round of funding led by Coatue Management and Sequoia Capital helped Notion raise $275 million. The investment valued Notion at $10 billion, and the company had 20 million users.

In 2022, Notion launched the Notion Certified Program, an official accreditation allowing users to expand their expertise. It also joined the Security First Initiative, a coalition of tech companies pledging to share security information with their customers.

In June 2022, Notion acquired calendar software Cron to add it to its suite of productivity apps.

In November 2022, Notion announced its official Japanese release.

In February 2023, Notion officially released AI service "Notion AI" that can be used on the workspace.

Software 
Notion is a collaboration platform with modified Markdown support that integrates kanban boards, tasks, wikis and databases. It is an all-in-one workspace for notetaking, knowledge and data management, and project and task management. It is a file management tool offering a unified workspace, allowing users to comment on ongoing projects, participate in discussions, and receive feedback. It can be accessed by cross-platform apps and by most web browsers.

It includes a tool for "clipping" content from webpages. It helps users schedule tasks, manage files, save documents, set reminders, keep agendas, and organize their work. LaTeX support allows writing and pasting equations in block or inline form.

Features 
Notion does not require specialized training to use. It offers AI capabilities and a library of free and fee-based templates, with the Notion AI functionality, users can write and improve content, summarize existing notes, daily standup, adjust the tone, translate or check text. Security features include Security Assertion Markup Language single sign-on and private team spaces for their Business and Enterprise tiers.

Notion integrates with SaaS tools including GitHub, GitLab and Zoom, Lucid Software, Cisco Webex and Typeform.

Pricing 
Notion has a four-tiered subscription model: Free, Plus, Business and Enterprise. Users can also earn credit via referrals. As of May 2020, the company upgraded the Personal plan to allow unlimited blocks, a change from the previous cap in the plan.

See also 
 Collaborative real-time editor
 Document collaboration
 Obsidian (software)

References

External links 
 

Note-taking software
Collaborative real-time editors
Collaborative software
Proprietary wiki software
Android (operating system) software
IOS software
Software companies based in California
Business software
Applications of artificial intelligence